St Austell is a town in Cornwall, England,  south of Bodmin and  west of the border with Devon.

St Austell is one of the largest towns in Cornwall; at the 2011 census it had a population of 19,958.

History

St Austell was a village centred around the parish church, until the arrival of significant tin mining in the 18th century turned it into a town.

St Austell is named after the 6th century Cornish saint, St Austol, a disciple of St Mewan. In a Vatican manuscript there is a 10th-century list of Cornish parish saints.  This includes Austoll, which means that the church and village existed at that time, shortly after 900.

St Austell is not mentioned in Domesday Book (1086). However A. L. Rowse, in his book St. Austell: Church, Town, and Parish, cites records which show a church was dedicated on 9 October 1262 by Bishop Bronescombe, and other records show a church there in 1169, dedicated to "Sanctus Austolus".  The current church dates from the 13th–14th centuries, and was extended in 1498–99. The join between the two sections is still visible.

In the time of Henry VIII, St Austell is described as a poor village. In John Leland's Itinerary he says, in around 1542, "". Neither travel writer, John Norden (c. 1547–1625) or Richard Carew (1555–1620) in his Survey of Cornwall mentioned St Austell as a place of any consequence. Oliver Cromwell granted a charter to hold a market on Friday, as a reward to a local gentleman who fought for him at the battle of Boconnoc.

The village started to grow in the 18th century.  The nearby Polgooth mine became known as the greatest tin mine in the world. Around 1760 the Land's End to Plymouth road went through the town. Along with William Cookworthy's discovery of china clay at Tregonning Hill in west Cornwall, and the same mineral, found in greater quantity in Hensbarrow downs north of St Austell, the town became more prominent.

China clay mining soon took over from tin and copper mining as the principal industry in the area, and this eventually contributed enormously to the growth of the town. The china clay industry really only came into its own during the mid 19th to early 20th century, at a time when the falling prices of tin and other metals forced many mines to close down or convert to clay mining. The success and high profitability of the industry attracted many families whose breadwinner had been put out of work by the depression in the local metal mining industry, and increased the population of the town considerably. This meant that more shops and businesses took root, providing more jobs and improving trade. This, along with other factors, led to St Austell becoming one of the ten most important commercial centres of Cornwall.

The town was a noted centre of Methodism.  By 1839 The West Briton recorded 37 non-conformist chapels in the town.

Climate

Redevelopment
Work began in 1963 on a brutalist-style pedestrian precinct which included shops, offices, and flats. The design was by Alister MacDonald & Partners and the materials reinforced concrete with some stone facing.

In the 2000s this area of the town had become very outdated, and underwent a £75 million redevelopment process. In August 2007, developers David McLean and demolition team Gilpin moved onto the town centre site to complete the preparation, with the Filmcentre which was originally an Odeon cinema dating back to 1936, being demolished in late September/early October.

In October 2007, the South West of England Regional Development Agency (SWRDA) announced the new development would be named White River Place. It was also announced that 50% of shop units had been leased to High Street stores, with New Look, Peacocks, Bonmarché and Wilko opening new stores. This would mean New Look relocating from its current premises in Fore Street and the return of Peacocks to St Austell following the demolition of its old store to make way for the new development. Bonmarche has since closed.

It was announced in October 2008 that the developer David McLean Developments had gone into administration and concern was expressed that this could jeopardise the completion of the project.

The new White River Cinema opened its doors in December 2008 for the first time: the cinema is technically advanced and the first purpose-built cinema in Cornwall for over 60 years. The Torchlight Carnival was revived  in November 2009 as a direct result of public demand through a survey conducted with local residents. The Torchlight Procession has become an important event in the town's calendar, heralding in the Winter celebrations and drawing thousands of people from across Cornwall and Devon. The event is run by a small group of non-affiliated volunteers.

The St Austell and Clay Country Eco-town is a plan for several new settlements around St Austell on old Imerys sites. It was given outline government approval in July 2009.

The Cornwall Council strategic planning committee voted in July 2011 to approve a £250 million beach resort scheme at Carlyon Bay, St Austell. The development was initially proposed in 2003.

Governance

The arms of St Austell are Argent a saltire raguly Gules.

Parliamentary
St Austell is in the parliamentary constituency of St Austell and Newquay which was created in 2010 by the Boundary Commission for England (increasing the number of seats in Cornwall from five to six). Before 2010 it was in the Truro and St Austell seat.

Local government
The main local authority is Cornwall Council, the unitary authority created as part of the 2009 structural changes to local government in England. The six former Districts and the former Cornwall County Council were abolished and replaced by Cornwall Council on 1 April 2009.

Also on 1 April 2009, four new parishes were created for the St Austell area. They are:
 St Austell Town Council covering Boscoppa, Bethel, Gover, Mount Charles, Poltair and Holmbush; represented by 20 councillors.
 Carlyon Parish Council covering Carlyon Bay and Tregrehan; represented by 9 councillors.
 St Austell Bay Parish Council covering Charlestown, Duporth, Porthpean and Trenarren; represented by 7 councillors.
 Pentewan Valley Parish Council covering Tregorrick, Trewhiddle, London Apprentice and Pentewan; represented by 9 councillors.

Before this date the area had been an unparished area.

Economy
St Austell is the main centre of the china clay industry in Cornwall and employs around 2,200 people , with sales of £195 million.

The St Austell Brewery, which celebrated its 150th anniversary in 2001, supplies cask ale to pubs in Cornwall and other parts of the country. Its flagship beer is St Austell Tribute; a number of other ales are brewed but are less commonly sold outside Cornwall. St Austell Brewery's first public house, The Seven Stars Inn, purchased in 1863, still stands today on East Hill in the town. Tregonissey House, the site of the company's first steam Brewery, built in 1870, can also be seen in Market Hill. A brewery museum and visitor centre is open to the public on the present brewery site in Trevarthian Road.

Tourism

As in much of Cornwall and neighbouring counties, tourism is increasingly important to St Austell's economy. Tourists are drawn to the area by nearby beaches and tourist attraction such as the Eden Project, sited in a former clay pit, and the Lost Gardens of Heligan.

St Austell is home to several public houses, numerous high street retailers, and several independent shops, many of which cater for tourists. The town has a small museum which is situated in the Market House. A Brewery Museum and Visitor Centre is situated on the site of the St Austell Brewery in Trevarthian Road.

Newspaper and radio
The town has two weekly newspapers:
 St Austell Guardian, part of the Cornish Guardian series published by Cornwall and Devon Media Ltd, has a long history in the town and is published on Friday.
 St Austell Voice, sister paper to the Newquay Voice, had offices close to the town centre in Truro Road, but has since moved to Old Vicarage Place. It is published on Wednesday

Radio St Austell Bay is a local radio station which broadcasts from studios at Tregorrick Park. It launched in January 2008 to cover the area from Trewoon in the west to Tywardreath in the east.

Landmarks

Notable Cornish architect Silvanus Trevail designed a number of St Austell's buildings and houses, including the Thin End and the Moorland Road terrace. Other notable architects from St Austell include John Goode, who contributed considerably during the 1970s to residential developments in the area.

Pevsner remarks in his guide to Cornwall that the following buildings are notable:
The Parish Church
The Old Market Hall, in Italian Renaissance style, 1844
Friends Meeting House, 1829, a plain granite structure
Masonic Hall, South Street, 1900 and is home to nine Masonic bodies
White Hart Hotel: once contained panoramic wallpaper of the Bay of Naples by Dufour (now in the Victoria and Albert Museum)
Holy Well at Menacuddle
Three buildings of the 1960s: Penrice School, 1960; Public Library, 1961; former Magistrates' Court, 1966

Transport

St Austell railway station was opened by the Cornwall Railway on 4 May 1859 on the hillside above the town centre. Two branch lines west of the town were later opened to serve the china clay industry; the Newquay and Cornwall Junction Railway which is still partly open, and the short-lived Trenance Valley line. The independent narrow gauge Pentewan Railway ran from West Hill to the coast at Pentewan. The Cornish Main Line in St Austell is quite renowned for its viaducts in the Gover Valley and Trenance areas of the town.

There was a siding located west of the viaduct. In the early years trains from St Austell had to push wagons over the tall, curving viaduct to shunt this siding. The Great Western Railway's instructions stated that: "Trucks may be pushed from St Austell to the Siding, but when this is done the speed of the Train between the two places must not exceed 8 miles an hour, and the head Guard must ride on the leading vehicle, unless it be a bonnet end one, in which case he must ride in the first low sided vehicle from it, to keep a good look out, and be prepared to give a signal to the Driver either by Day or Night, as may be required". There are also CrossCountry services on most days to the North of England and Scotland.

The town's bus station faces the entrance to the railway station to offer an easy interchange between buses and trains. National Express coach services call here, a dedicated link operates to the Eden Project, and local buses operate to villages such as Fowey and Mevagissey. The town can be accessed by the A390 which by-passes the town to the south on its way from Liskeard to Truro, or by the A391 from Bodmin, or by the A3058 from Newquay. In addition there are the B3273 to Mevagissey, the B3274 to Padstow and the A3082 to Fowey.

St Austell bus station

St Austell bus station is the main bus and coach terminus for the town. The bus station is located in the forecourt of the railway station, formerly a railway goods yard.

The bus station was redeveloped again in 2008, the new facility being opened on 3 November. It now comprises seven stands and shares facilities such as a taxi rank and buffet with the adjoining railway station which is operated by Great Western Railway, a sister company to the main local bus operator. Local services are provided by First Kernow. Long-distance coach services are part of the National Express Coaches network.

History
The Great Western Railway started to operate what they called 'road motors' from outside their railway station on 3 August 1908.  These first services ran to St Columb Road via St Dennis.

A bus garage was later provided nearby in Eliot Road, next to the railway's new goods yard.  The network was progressively extended over the next twenty years, after which time the services were transferred to the Western National Omnibus Company, formed in 1929 to free the railway company from its bus services and avoid complaints about its transport monopoly. Western National has now become part of the FirstGroup and operates as First Kernow.

Education
St Austell has three comprehensive schools, Poltair School, formerly the grammar school, and Penrice Academy; together with Brannel School which is situated in the nearby village of St Stephen-in-Brannel. Several of these are joining an academy trust called CELT (Cornwall Education and Learning Trust).

Cornwall College St Austell is a Further & Higher Education institution incorporating the former St Austell Sixth Form Centre and Mid Cornwall College of Further Education. The college is based at John Keay House, which is also home to the college group's headquarters.

There are a number of primary schools within the town.

Health services

St Austell has its own hospital, St Austell Community Hospital, formerly called Penrice Hospital.

Religious sites
The church was originally dedicated to St Austol, a Breton saint associated with St Meven, but is now dedicated to the Holy Trinity. By 1150 it had been appropriated to the Priory of Tywardreath by the Cardinhams: this continued until 1535. There was originally a Norman church here, of which some remains may be seen.

The present church is of the 15th century and is large because the mediaeval parish was also a large one: the tower is impressive. All four outside walls bear sculptural groups in carved niches: the Twelve Apostles in three groups on the north, east and south; the Holy Trinity above the Annunciation and below that the Risen Christ between two saints on the west. The tower can be dated to between 1478 and 1487 by the arms of Bishop Courtenay, and the walls are faced in Pentewan stone.

The tower and other parts of the church have an interior lining of granite On the south side of the church, a formerly separate chantry has been incorporated into the church when it was extended. (The chantry itself was abolished in 1543.)

There are holy wells at Menacuddle and Towan. A new organ was placed on the north side of the chancel in 1880 and the first recital was held on 22 April. The organ was built by Messrs Bryceson Brothers and Ellis and cost circa £600. The church is dedicated to the Holy Trinity, is Grade I listed, and seats 300. There is a Cornish cross in the churchyard which was found buried in the ground on the manor of Treverbyn in 1879. This cross was erected in the churchyard on a new base in 1879. Another cross is in the grounds of a house originally known as Moor Cottage. This house was built in 1819; the cross was brought from Hewas in the parish of Ladock.

The parish of St Austell was part of the archdeaconry of Cornwall and Diocese of Exeter until 1876 when the Diocese of Truro was established. A new rural deanery of St Austell was established in 1875. The style of worship of the parish church is in the Evangelical tradition of the Church of England. The two chapels-of-ease are All Saints, Pentewan, and St Levan's, Higher Porthpean. In the 19th century the following parishes were created out of St Austell parish: St Blazey (1845); Charlestown (1846), Treverbyn (1847), and Par (1846 out of St Blazey and Tywardreath).

Quakers
There was formerly a Quaker burial ground at Tregongeeves, just outside the town on the Truro Road. A high stone wall bounds the remaining acre of land; access can be gained through a wrought iron gate.

Approximately forty of the headstones from Tregongeeves were removed and are now located at the Friends meeting house in the High Cross Street in St Austell, just below the high wall which surrounds St Austell railway station. That meeting house is still in use.

Sport

Speedway
Speedway racing first took place a venue called Rocky Park, under the name "St Austell Gulls". The sport was a hit during various years, between 1949 and 1963 at the Cornish Stadium. The sport returned to the area in the late 1990s, in the Clay Country Moto Parc, located at Old Pound, Nanpean.

The club operated as the St Austell Gulls for four years, until the club changed ownership, and moved up a league to the Premier League, re-formed as the Trelawny JAG Tigers, until site owners Imerys Minerals Ltd ended the lease. Speedway has not been held in Cornwall since. Many attempts have been made to re-introduce the sport, but none have got past planning permission. The two highest profile bids were at Par Moor Motor Museum and St Eval Raceway. The owner of the land for the Par Moor bid confirmed that he would rent the land for speedway but locals objected. The St Eval bid failed after residents expressed fears about noise.

Stock car racing
Stock car racing, promoted by 1950s Kiwi Speedway star Trevor Redmond, ran side by side with speedway on numerous occasions. Numerous championships were run here, including the 1972 BriSCA World Championship for Formula 2 cars, won by Jimmy Murray from Northern Ireland. It closed its doors in 1987.

Greyhound racing
A greyhound racing track was also opened at the Cornish Stadium and traded from 1958 to 1986. The racing was independent (not affiliated to the sports governing body the National Greyhound Racing Club) and was known as a flapping track, which was the nickname given to independent tracks.

Football
St Austell Football Club was formed on 17 September 1890. In 1908 the club won its first trophy: the Cornwall Charity Cup. The club achieved some success in the late 1920s and 1930s, winning the Senior Cup and Charity Cup twice. In May 2009, the team won the Senior Cup with a closely fought 3–2 victory over Saltash United.

Rugby and tennis
Tregorrick Park is the home of St Austell RFC, St Austell Tennis Club and Cornwall Table Tennis Centre. St Austell RFC play in the Tribute Western Counties West league and the club supports two senior teams, a ladies team and 14 youth teams covering most age groups. Founded in 1963 St Austell RFC has played at the Tregorrick Park ground since their move from Cromwell Road in the 1980s to make way for the Asda supermarket.

Tregorrick Park also hosts a gym, sports hall, squash courts, bar, function room and holds local events such as firework displays and schools cross country competitions.

Cricket
Wheal Eliza cricket ground is the home of St Austell Cricket Club, and is also used for Minor Counties matches. The club supports four senior teams, a ladies' team and youth teams. Facilities at Wheal Eliza includes two playing fields with their own changing room facilities enabling the club to hold two competitive matches every match day. The club also has a pavilion, scorebox, artificial and grass nets.

Baseball
In 2017, the St Austell Claycutters baseball club was established to compete in the South West Baseball League. While the team are named and associated with St. Austell, all outdoor training and home games are held on the sports fields at Fowey River Academy in Fowey.

Notable people
Alan Cowland (1941 – 2005), was a British motorcycle speedway rider, born St Austell
Alfred Leslie Rowse (1903 – 1997), a British historian and writer, educated in St Austell
Alice Hext (1865 – 1939), a Cornish philanthropist, garden developer and magistrate, born St Austell
John Colenso (1814 – 1883), cleric and mathematician, the first Bishop of Natal, born in St Austell
Jonathan Crowther (1794 – 1856), Wesleyan Methodist minister, born St Austell
Keith Boanas (born 1959), an English football manager, born St Austell
Mary Corinne Quintrell (1839 – 1918), English-born American educator and clubwoman, born St Austell
Michael Hutt (born 1957) is Professor of Nepali and Himalayan Studies, educated in St Austell
Paul Rapsey Hodge (1808 – 1871), English-American inventor and mechanical engineer, born St Austell
Steve Baker (born 1971), British politician, born St Austell
Vaughn Toulouse (1959 – 1991), British singer; founding member of Department S, raised in St Austell

See also

 Boscoppa, a suburb of St Austell
 Carclaze. a suburb of St Austell
 Charlestown, the port of St Austell
 St Austell with Fowey, a former local government area
 St Stephen-in-Brannel, a district of village near St Austell
 Sticker, a village near St Austell
 Treverbyn, a nearby village and parish
 Trewoon, a village near St Austell
 People from St Austell
 HMS St Austell Bay (K634)

References

Further reading

 Hammond, Joseph (1897) St Austell: being an account of St Austell, town, church, district and people. London: Skeffington & Son
 Rowse, A. L. (1960) St Austell: Church, Town, Parish. St Austell: H. E. Warne
 Roberts, E (1967) The Story of St Austell Parish Church, Ramsgate: The Church Publishers

External links

 St Austell Town Council
 
 Cornwall Record Office Online Catalogue for St Austell 
 

 
Civil parishes in Cornwall
Cornish Killas
Towns in Cornwall